Osama bin Laden took ideological guidance from prominent militant Islamist scholars and ideologues from the classical to contemporary eras, such as Ibn Taymiyya, Ibn al-Qayyim al-Jawziyyah, Sayyid Qutb and Abdullah Azzam. During his middle and high school years, Bin Laden was educated in Al-Thagr model school, a public school in Jeddah run by Islamist exiles of the Muslim Brotherhood; during which he was immensely influenced by pan-Islamist ideals and displayed strict religious commitment. As a teenager, Bin Laden attended and led Muslim Brotherhood-run "Awakening" camps held on desert outskirts; that intended to raise the youth in religious values, instil martial spirit and sought spiritual seclusion from "the corruptions" of modernity and rapidly urbanising society of 1970s Saudi Arabia.

While some reporters have speculated that Bin Laden was an adherent of the Wahhabi movement, other researchers have disputed this notion. He subscribed to the Athari (literalist) school of Islamic theology. During his studies in King Abdul Aziz University, Bin Laden became immersed in the writings of the Egyptian militant Islamist scholar Sayyid Qutb; most notably Milestones and In The Shade of the Qur'an. Bin Laden adopted Qutb's anti-Westernism, his assertion that Muslim World has been steeped in a state of Jahiliyya (pre-Islamic ignorance) and embraced his revolutionary call for overthrowing the Arab governments by means of an ideologically committed vanguard.

To effectuate his beliefs, Osama bin Laden founded al-Qaeda, a pan-Islamist militant organization, with the objective of recruiting Muslim youth for participating in armed Jihad across various regions of the Islamic World such as Palestine, Kashmir, Central Asia, etc. In conjunction with several other Islamic leaders, he issued two fatwas—in 1996 and then again in 1998—that Muslims should fight those that either support Israel or support Western military forces in Islamic countries, stating that those in that mindset are the enemy, including citizens from the United States and allied countries. His goal was for Western military forces to withdraw from the Middle East and for foreign aid to Israel to cease as the aid is used to fund Israeli policy in the region.

Sharia
Following a form of Islamism, Bin Laden believed that the restoration of God's law will set things right in the Muslim world. He stated, "When we used to follow Muhammad's revelation we were in great happiness and in great dignity, to Allah belongs the credit and praise." He believed "the only Islamic country" in the Muslim world was Afghanistan under the rule of Mullah Omar's Taliban before that regime was overthrown in late 2001.

Differences with Wahhabi Ideology
Bin Laden's connection with contemporary Wahhabi Islam is disputed. Some believe his ideology is different in crucial ways. While modern Wahhabi doctrine states that only political leaders can call for jihad, bin Laden believed he could declare jihad. Modern  Wahhabism forbids disobedience to a ruler unless the rule has commanded his/her subjects to violate religious commandments.

A number of Islamists have asserted that Bin Laden has no direct connections with Wahhabism, although he may have been inspired by the movement of Muhammad ibn 'Abd al- Wahhab and its ideals. Bin Laden's Yemeni origins also point to a non-Wahhabi background. Moreover, the traditional Wahhabi Shaykhs are strongly opposed to war-tactics like suicide bombings justified by the Al-Qaeda ideologues, which is regarded as a perversion of Islamic teachings. Furthermore, the basic goals of bin Laden are different to contemporary Wahhabists. Bin Laden was most interested in "resisting western domination and combating regimes that fail to rule according to Islamic law," while Wahhabism focuses on correct methods of worshiping God, removing idols, and ensuring adherence to Islamic law.

On the other hand, some believe  bin Laden "adopted Wahhabi terminology" when they called America "the Hubal of the age", since Hubal was a stone idol and idolatry (shirk) was the primary Wahhabi sin. According to Jonathan Sozek:"Salafism can be understood as an umbrella term under which a movement like Wahhabism might be placed. Not everyone who identifies with Salafism is a Wahhabi... . Bin Laden himself has identified himself with Salafism (meaning little more, perhaps, than a Christian identifying themselves as an evangelical), but this says nothing as to his relationship to Wahhabism."

Jihad
Jihad, a common Arabic word meaning to "strife or struggle", is referred to in the Qur'an to indicate that Muslims must be willing to exert effort in the cause of God, using their wealth and themselves. It refers to the internal struggle to be a better Muslim, the struggle between good and evil. In a January 2004 message Bin Laden called for the establishment of provisional underground ruling councils in Muslim countries to be made up of "ulema, leaders who are obeyed among their people, dignitaries, nobles, and merchants." The councils would be sure "the people" had "easy access to arms, particularly light weapons; anti-armored rockets, such as RPGs; and anti-tank mines" to fight "raids" by "the Romans," i.e. United States.

His interviews, video messages and other communications always mentioned and almost always dwelt on need for jihad to right what he believed were injustices against Muslims by the United States and sometimes other non-Muslim states, the need to eliminate the state of Israel, and to force the withdrawal of the U.S. from the Middle East. Occasionally other issues arose; he called for Americans to "reject the immoral acts of fornication, homosexuality, intoxicants, gambling, and usury," in an October 2002 letter.

Former CIA officer and chief of Bin Laden Issue Station, Michael Scheuer writes: "In the context of the ideas bin Laden shares with his brethren, the military actions of al Qaeda and its allies.. are part of a defensive jihad sanctioned by the revealed word of God.. bin Laden believes Islam is being attacked by America and its allies and is simply recognizing his responsibility to fight in a defensive jihad. Further, bin Laden is calling on other Muslims to similarly identify the threat and to do their duty to God and their brethren... Having defined the threat to Islam as the U.S.-led crusaders' attacks and prescribing a defensive jihad as the only appropriate response, bin Laden regards al Qaeda as having an important role to play—"the vanguard of a Muslim nation"

Grievances against countries

East Timor
In  his November 2001 statement, Osama bin Laden criticized the UN and Australian "Crusader" forces for ensuring the independence of the mostly Catholic East Timor from the mostly Muslim state of Indonesia.

India
Bin Laden considered India to be a part of the 'Crusader-Zionist-Hindu' conspiracy against the Islamic world.

Saudi Arabia
Bin Laden was born in Saudi Arabia and had a close relationship with the Saudi royal family, but his opposition to the Saudi government stemmed from his radical ideology. The Saudi decision to allow the U.S. military into the country in 1990 to defend against a possible attack by Saddam Hussein upset bin Laden, although he was not necessarily opposed to the royal family at this time or going to war with Iraq and even offered to send his mujahedeen from Afghanistan to defend Saudi Arabia should Iraq attack, an offer which was rebuked by King Fahd. From his point of view, "for the Muslim Saudi monarchy to invite non-Muslim American troops to fight against Muslim Iraqi soldiers was a serious violation of Islamic law".

Bin Laden, in his 1996 declaration entitled "Declaration of War against the Americans Occupying the Land of the Two Holy Places", identified several grievances that he had about Saudi Arabia, the birthplace and holy land of Islam. Bin Laden said these grievances about Saudi Arabia:

Bin Laden wanted to overthrow the Saudi monarchy (and the governments of Middle Eastern states) and establish an Islamic State according to Shari'a law (Islamic Holy Law), to "unite all Muslims and to establish a government which follows the rule of the Caliphs."

Soviet Union

In 1979, bin Laden opposed the Soviet Union invading Afghanistan and would soon heed the call to arms by Afghan freedom fighters. Bin Laden would use his own independent wealth and resources to get Arab fighters from Egypt, Lebanon, Kuwait and Turkey to join the Afghans in their battle against the Soviets. While bin Laden praised the U.S. intervention early on, being happy that the Afghans were getting aid from all over the world to battle the Soviets, his view of the U.S. soon grew sour, stating "Personally neither I nor my brothers saw evidence of American help. When my mujahedin were victorious and the Russians were driven out, differences started..."

After two years into the Soviet war, bin Laden headed to Sudan to continue his work as a construction engineer and an agriculturalist, building bridges alongside some of the people he had fought alongside during the war.

United Kingdom
Bin Laden believed that Israeli Jews controlled the British government, directing it to kill as many Muslims as it could. He cited British participation in 1998's Operation Desert Fox as proof of this allegation. The profound statements from Bin Laden is a reference to Britain's involvement on the creation of the Jewish state in 1948 on the former Mandatory Palestine.

United States

Bin Laden's stated motivations of the September 11 attacks include the support of Israel by the United States, the presence of the U.S. military in the Saudi Arabian borders, which he considered to be sacred Islamic territory, and the U.S. enforcement of sanctions against Iraq.  He first called for jihad against the United States in 1996. This call solely focused on U.S. troops in Saudi Arabia; bin Laden loathed their presence and wanted them removed in a "rain of bullets".

Bin Laden's hatred and disdain for the U.S. were also manifested while he lived in Sudan. There he told Al-Qaeda fighters-in-training:

In order to fight the US, apart the military option, he also called for asceticism as well as economic boycott, as during this August 1996 speech in the Hindu Kush mountains:

Grievances against the United States
In his 1998 fatwa entitled, "Jihad Against Jews and Crusaders" bin Laden identified three grievances against the U.S.:

Bin Laden criticized the United States in a "letter to the American people" published in late 2002, and further outlined his grievances with the United States in a 2004 speech directed towards the American people.

Favorable opinion of two American authors
In 2011, in a review of a new book from former CIA officer Michael Scheuer, professor and writer Fouad Ajami wrote that "[i]n 2007, [bin Laden] singled out two western authors whose knowledge he had high regard for: Noam Chomsky and Michael Scheuer.

John F. Kennedy conspiracy theory
Bin Laden supported the conspiracy theory that John F. Kennedy was killed by the "owners of the major corporations who were benefiting from its (Vietnam War) continuation":
In the Vietnam War, the leaders of the White House claimed at the time that it was a necessary and crucial war, and during it, Donald Rumsfeld and his aides murdered two million villagers. And when Kennedy took over the presidency and deviated from the general line of policy drawn up for the White House and wanted to stop this unjust war, that angered the owners of the major corporations who were benefiting from its continuation.

And so Kennedy was killed, and al-Qaida wasn't present at that time, but rather, those corporations were the primary beneficiary from his killing. And the war continued after that for approximately one decade. But after it became clear to you that it was an unjust and unnecessary war, you made one of your greatest mistakes, in that you neither brought to account nor punished those who waged this war, not even the most violent of its murderers, Rumsfeld.

Killing of non-Islamic believers
According to bin Laden's ideology, non-Islamic believers may be deliberately killed in support of jihadism. This position evolved from an earlier, less violent one. In a 1998 interview, he alleged that in fighting jihad, "we differentiate between men and women, and between children and old people," unlike hypocritical "infidels" who "preach one thing and do another." But two years later he told another interviewer that those who say "killing a child is not valid" in Islam "speak without any knowledge of Islamic law", because killing non-Islamic believers may be done in vengeance. In other words, bin Laden's interpretation of Islamic doctrine allows retaliation against U.S. citizens because of perceived indiscriminate U.S. aggression against Muslims. To another question by a Muslim interviewer about Muslims killed in the September 11 attacks, bin Laden replied that "Islamic law says that Muslim should not stay long in the land of infidels," although he suggested Muslim casualties in the attack were collateral damage.

Other ideologies
In his messages, bin Laden has opposed "pan-Arabism, socialism, communism, democracy and other doctrines," with the exception of Islam. Democracy and "legislative council[s] of representatives," are denounced, calling the first "the religion of ignorance," and the second "councils of polytheism." In what one critic has called a contradiction, he has also praised the principle of governmental "accountability," citing the Western democracy of Spain: "Spain is an infidel country, but its economy is stronger than ours because the ruler there is accountable."

Opposition to music
Bin Laden opposed music on religious grounds. Despite his love of horse racing and ownership of racing horses, the presence of a band and music at the Khartoum race track annoyed him so much that he stopped attending races in Sudan. "Music is the flute of the devil," he told his Sudanese stable-mate Issam Turabi. Despite his hatred for music, Bin Laden reportedly had a celebrity crush on American singer Whitney Houston, and, according to poet and activist Kola Boof, wanted to make her one of his wives.

Support for environmentalism
Osama bin Laden and his aides have, on more than one occasion, denounced the United States for damaging the environment.
You have destroyed nature with your industrial waste and gases more than any other nation in history. Despite this, you refuse to sign the Kyoto agreement so that you can secure the profit of your greedy companies and industries.
Ayman al-Zawahiri, Osama bin Laden's aide, said global warming reflected how brutal and greedy the Western Crusader world is, with America at its top 

Bin Laden has also called for a boycott of American goods and the destruction of the American economy as a way of fighting global warming.

Technology
On the subject of technology, bin Laden is said to have ambivalent feelings – being interested in "earth-moving machinery and genetic engineering of plants, on the one hand," but rejecting "chilled water on the other." In Afghanistan, his sons' education reportedly eschewed the arts and technology and amounted to "little other than memoriz[ing] the Quran all day".

Masturbation
Osama bin Laden had an infamous pornography collection in the Abbottabad compound. Following this, he believed that masturbation was justifiable in "extreme" cases.

Jews, Christians, and Shia Muslims
Bin Laden was profoundly anti-Semitic, and delivered many warnings against alleged Jewish conspiracies: "These Jews are masters of usury and leaders in treachery. They will leave you nothing, either in this world or the next."

At the same time, bin Laden's organization worked with Shia militants: "Every Muslim, from the moment they realize the distinction in their hearts, hates Americans, hates Jews, and hates Israelis. This is a part of our belief and our religion." It was apparently inspired by the successes of Shia radicalism—such as the 1979 Iranian Revolution, the implementation of Sharia by Ayatollah Khomeini, and the human wave attacks committed by radical Shia teenagers during the 1980s Iran–Iraq War. This point of view may have been influenced by the fact that Bin Laden's mother belonged to the Shia sect. While in Sudan, "senior managers in al Qaeda maintained contacts with" Shia Iran and Hezbollah, its closely allied Shia "worldwide terrorist organization. ... Al Qaeda members received advice and training from Hezbollah." where they are thought to have borrowed the techniques of suicide and simultaneous bombing. Because of the Shia-Sunni schism, this collaboration could only go so far.

See also
War on Terror
Arab–Israeli conflict
Iranian Revolution
Islamic extremism
Islamism
Palestinian political violence

References

External links

 In The Words of Osama Bin Laden - slideshow by Life magazine

Beliefs and ideology
Laden
Views of Judaism by individual